The 2016 New York Empire season was the inaugural season of the franchise in World TeamTennis (WTT). The Empire finished last in WTT with 2 wins and 10 losses.

Season recap

Founding of franchise
On February 17, 2016, WTT announced that the league would return to New York City for the 2016 season. The Empire announced it would play its home matches at historic Forest Hills Stadium. The 14,000-seat stadium was to be reconfigured to seat approximately 2,500 fans for Empire home matches. Concurrent with that announcement, the league also reported that the newly formed Empire had acquired the rights to former world number 1 male player Andy Roddick in a trade with the Orange County Breakers. Patrick McEnroe was named the team's head coach. McEnroe said when he received a call from WTT co-founder Billie Jean King and commissioner Ilana Kloss telling him the league was hoping to bring a team back to New York to play in Forest Hills, "That was a no-brainer for me. I'm excited to be back in the game." Speaking about Roddick, McEnroe added, "He and I have a great history. I think he still really loves to play. I'm super happy that he'll be part of the team." "As both a player and an owner I have always enjoyed all that encompasses Mylan WTT," said Roddick. "To be able to play on the legendary courts at Forest Hills and be involved with a team in a city that I love, New York, will make this even more special."

Draft
As an expansion team, the Empire had no returning players to protect in the 2016 WTT draft other than Andy Roddick, whom the team had acquired in a trade. Roddick was protected in the first round of the marquee player portion of the draft, and the Empire passed on making a second marquee selection. In the roster player portion of the draft, the Empire was interested in selecting Christina McHale, a resident of nearby Englewood Cliffs, New Jersey, and traded up to do so. The trade with the Springfield Lasers gave the Empire the first overall selection in the roster player portion of the draft along with the first pick in the fourth round in exchange for the third pick in each of the first and third rounds. As expected, McHale was taken with the first overall selection. She had previously played in WTT in 2011, with the Kansas City Explorers. The Empire used its next two picks to take a pair of Argentines: Guido Pella and María Irigoyen, neither of whom has played in WTT in the past. Their final choice was the Austrian Oliver Marach, also a WTT rookie. The Empire elected not to choose a roster-exempt player in the fifth round.

Skupski replaces Marach
On July 20, 2016, the Empire announced it had signed 2015 WTT Male Rookie of the Year Neal Skupski to replace Oliver Marach, who had been selected to represent Austria at the 2016 Summer Olympics.

Pella selected for Argentina's Olympic team
On July 29, 2016, the Empire announced that it had signed Noah Rubin and Daniel Nguyen as substitute players to replace Guido Pella, who was to play in the Empire's first three matches of the season before going to Rio de Janeiro to represent Argentina at the 2016 Summer Olympics. Rubin was scheduled to appear in the Empire's home match on August 3. Nguyen appeared in road matches on August 5 and 6. Rubin, who is from nearby Rockville Centre, New York, said, "I am truly excited to play in front of a home crowd. Being from New York, I grew up watching World TeamTennis and it will be great to compete in it." He added, "I was always around the old New York Sportimes team and really found it to be a blast. Being able to play against some pretty good competition in a fun atmosphere is something I really look forward to. It's a really fun thing for the players and for the fans. Very interactive."

Inaugural match
The Empire made its debut on July 31, 2016, with a home match against the five-time defending WTT champion Washington Kastles. The match opened with Guido Pella and Neal Skupski dropping a men's doubles tiebreaker. The Empire won only one set, when Pella took the men's singles, 5–2. The Kastles won the match, 22–15.

First win in franchise history
After opening the season with three straight losses, the Empire secured the first win in franchise history on August 4, 2016, when it defeated the Springfield Lasers, 19–15, at Forest Hills Stadium. Long Island native Noah Rubin teamed with Neal Skupski to take the opening set of men's doubles, 5–2. After dropping the second and third sets, the Empire found itself trailing, 12–9. In the fourth set, New Jersey native Christina McHale and María Irigoyen held all three of their service games while breaking Michaëlla Krajicek and Pauline Parmentier twice for a 5–1 women's doubles set win that gave the Empire a 14–13 lead heading to the final set. Irigoyen and Skupski held all four of their service games and managed a break to win the fifth set of mixed doubles, 5–2, and close out the victory.

Empire signs Willis and gets second win
On August 8, 2016, the Empire signed Marcus Willis as a substitute player. Just a few months earlier, Willis became the lowest ranked qualifier to reach the second round of a Grand Slam tournament since 1988, when he defeated Ričardas Berankis at the 2016 Wimbledon Championships.

Willis made his Empire debut that same evening in a road match against the five-time defending WTT champion Washington Kastles. After getting broken early and falling behind, 0–3, in the set, María Irigoyen and Neal Skupski broke back and got the Empire off to a good start when by winning the opening set of mixed doubles in a tiebreaker. Christina McHale broke Madison Brengle's serve twice for a 5–1 women's singles set win that gave the Empire a 10–5 lead. Willis and Skupski dropped the third set of men's doubles in a tiebreaker, and Irigoyen and McHale lost the fourth set of women's doubles to shrink the Empire's lead to 16–15 heading to the final set. Willis and Stéphane Robert each served well and held all four of their service games to send the man's singles set to a tiebreaker with the Empire leading, 20–19. Willis avoided extended play by taking the tiebreaker to seal a 21–19 victory that improved the Empire's record to 2 wins and 5 losses.

Roddick makes his debut, and the Empire is eliminated
Following the Empire's road victory over the Washington Kastles the previous evening, Andy Roddick made his Empire debut in a rematch with the Kastles at home on August 9, 2016. Roddick and Neal Skupski opened the match by taking the men's doubles set in a tiebreaker after both teams held all their service games. Madison Brengle's 5–0 set win over Christina McHale put the Kastles in front, 9–5. In men's singles, Roddick dropped one of his service games and could not convert any of his three break point opportunities against Stéphane Robert, which gave the Kastles the set, 5–3, and a 14–8 lead in the match. Brengle and Andreja Klepač followed with a 5–0 women's doubles set win over McHale and María Irigoyen that extended the Washington lead to 19–8. Irigoyen and Skupski took the mixed doubles set, 5–2, to send the match to extended play with the Kastles leading, 21–13. Klepač and Treat Huey held serve in the opening game of extended play to give the Kastles a 22–13 victory and drop the Empire's record to 2 wins and 6 losses.

Roddick remained with the Empire the following evening for a road match against the Philadelphia Freedoms. The match opened with Roddick and Skupski facing Donald Young and Fabrice Martin. Both teams held three service games and broke once to send the set to a tiebreaker. Empire coach Patrick McEnroe substituted Marcus Willis for Skupski in the tiebreaker, but the Freedoms prevailed. After McHale took the first three games of the women's singles set from Naomi Broady, the Freedoms substituted Samantha Crawford for Broady. McHale broke Crawford in her service game and took the set, 5–0, to give the Empire a 9–5 lead. The Freedoms regained the lead at 10–9, when Martin and Broady took the mixed doubles set, 5–0, from Skupski and McHale, who had substituted for Irigoyen after the Empire fell behind, 0–3. McHale and Irigoyen won 21 of the 32 points played against Broady and Crawford in the women's doubles set for a 5–1 victory that gave the Empire a 14–11 lead. In the final set, Young held his four service games and broke Roddick once for a 5–2 men's singles set win that tied the match at 16 and sent it to a super tiebreaker. Young took the super tiebreaker, 7–3, to give the Freedoms a 17–16 victory and eliminate the Empire from postseason contention with a record of 2 wins and 7 losses.

Season finale
The Empire met the Springfield Lasers in the season finale for both teams in Springfield, Missouri on August 13, 2016. The loser of the match would finish last in WTT. The Empire fell behind early, losing the first three sets of men's, women's and mixed doubles to give the Lasers a 15–8 lead. Christina McHale won the fourth set of women's singles, 5–2, to cut the Lasers lead to 17–13 heading to the final set. Marcus Willis won the men's singles set in a tiebreaker to send the match to extended play with the Lasers leading 21–18. After Willis won the first game of extended play, Benjamin Becker won the second to secure a 22–19 victory for the Lasers that gave the Empire WTT's worst record in 2016.

Event chronology
 February 17, 2016: WTT announced the founding of the New York Empire as an expansion franchise to begin play in the 2016 season at Forest Hills Stadium.
 February 17, 2016: The Empire acquired Andy Roddick in a trade with the Orange County Breakers for undisclosed consideration.
 March 25, 2016: The Empire protected Andy Roddick and drafted Christina McHale, Guido Pella, María Irigoyen and Oliver Marach at the WTT draft.
 July 20, 2016: The Empire signed Neal Skupski as a roster player to replace Oliver Marach.
 July 29, 2016: The Empire signed Noah Rubin and Daniel Nguyen as substitute players.
 August 8, 2016: The Empire signed Marcus Willis as a substitute player.
 August 10, 2016: The Empire was eliminated from postseason contention with a record of 2 wins and 7 losses, when it lost a road match against the Philadelphia Freedoms, 17–16, in a super tiebreaker (7–3).

Draft picks
As an expansion team, the Empire was assigned the middle draft position closest to the first draft position, since there was an even number of teams in the league. WTT conducted its 2016 draft on March 25, in Key Biscayne, Florida. In the roster player portion of the draft, the Empire traded the third pick in the first round and the third pick in the third round to the Springfield Lasers in exchange for the first pick in the first round and the first pick in the fourth round. The selections made by the Empire are shown in the table below.

Match log
{| align="center" border="1" cellpadding="2" cellspacing="1" style="border:1px solid #aaa"
|-
! colspan="2" style="background:#14234B; color:#F18121" | Legend
|-
! bgcolor="ccffcc" | Empire Win
! bgcolor="ffbbbb" | Empire Loss
|-
! colspan="2" | Home team in CAPS
|}

Team personnel
Reference:

On-court personnel
  Patrick McEnroe, Coach
  María Irigoyen
  Oliver Marach
  Christina McHale
  Daniel Nguyen
  Guido Pella
  Andy Roddick
  Noah Rubin
  Neal Skupski
  Marcus Willis

Front office
 Michael Coakley, representing NY TeamTennis LLC, Owner
 Colleen Hopkins, General Manager

Notes:

Statistics
Players are listed in order of their game-winning percentage provided they played in at least 40% of the Empire's games in that event, which is the WTT minimum for qualification for league leaders in individual statistical categories.
Men's singles

Women's singles

Men's doubles

Women's doubles

Mixed doubles

Team totals

Notes:

Transactions
 February 17, 2017: The Empire acquired Andy Roddick in a trade with the Orange County Breakers for undisclosed consideration.
 March 25, 2016: The Empire protected Andy Roddick and drafted Christina McHale, Guido Pella, María Irigoyen and Oliver Marach at the WTT draft.
 July 20, 2016: The Empire signed Neal Skupski as a roster player to replace Oliver Marach.
 July 29, 2016: The Empire signed Noah Rubin and Daniel Nguyen as substitute players.
 August 8, 2016: The Empire signed Marcus Willis as a substitute player.

See also

Sports in New York City

References

External links
New York Empire official website
World TeamTennis official website

New York Empire season
New York Empire 2016
New York Empire